The Ileksa is a river in Onezhsky District of Arkhangelsk Oblast and Pudozhsky District of the Republic of Karelia in Russia. It is the principal tributary of Lake Vodlozero, and thus belongs to the basins of Lake Onega and of the Baltic Sea. The main tributary of the Ileksa is the Chusreka (left).

Ileksa is part of major waterway, which starts as the Verkhnyaya, which is a tributary of Lake Kalgachinskoye, and continues as the Vodla (which flows out of Lake Vodlozero) to Lake Onega, further as the Svir to Lake Ladoga, and further as the Neva to the Gulf of Finland of the Baltic Sea. The Ileksa connects lakes Kalgachinskoye and Vodlozero. The course of the river passes a number of lakes, the biggest of which are Lake Monastyrskoye, Lake Ik, and Lake Luzskoye, all located in Arkhangelsk Oblast close to the border with Karelia. There are many rapids on the Ileksa.

The river flows in the coniferous forest (taiga). Until the 1990s, the Ileksa was used for timber rafting. There is currently no population along the Ileksa.

Almost all of the valley of the Ileksa belongs to the Vodlozersky National Park, shared by Arkhangelsk Oblast and the Republic of Karelia. The park was established in 1991 to protect the taiga, coniferous forests. Since 2001, the National Park has the status of the UNESCO Biosphere Reserve, the first one in Russia.

References

External links

Rivers of Arkhangelsk Oblast
Rivers of the Republic of Karelia